The Jimmy Carter Peanut Statue is a monument located in Plains, Georgia, United States. Built in 1976, the roadside attraction depicts a large peanut with a toothy grin, and was built to support Jimmy Carter during the 1976 United States presidential election.

History
The statue was commissioned by the Indiana Democratic Party during the 1976 United States presidential election as a form of support for Democratic candidate Jimmy Carter's campaign through Indiana. The statue, a  peanut, references Carter's previous career as a peanut farmer. According to The New York Times, the statue is made of "wooden hoops, chicken wire, aluminum foil, and polyurethane". The peanut features a grin, modeled after Carter's, which he was known for during the campaign. The statue is the second-tallest statue of a peanut in the world, with the "World's Largest Peanut" located several miles away in Ashburn, Georgia. The statue initially was located at the train station in Plains, but in 2000, it was damaged in a car wreck, and after repairs it was moved to an area along Georgia State Route 45, near the Baptist church where Carter teaches Sunday school. The statue features a large hole on its rear side, which, according to urban legend, was cut by the United States Secret Service to ensure there were no explosives or assassins in the statue.

See also
 1976 in art

References

External links
 

1976 establishments in Georgia (U.S. state)
1976 sculptures
Buildings and structures in Sumter County, Georgia
Food and drink sculptures
Jimmy Carter
Roadside attractions in Georgia (U.S. state)
Sculptures in Georgia (U.S. state)
Carter
Peanuts